BDF or Bdf may refer to:

 Backward differentiation formula, a numerical method for solving ordinary differential equations
 Ballroom Dancers' Federation, a British organization for competitive ballroom dancers
 Bates Dance Festival, a yearly dance festival held at Bates College.
 Banca Dacia Felix (Dacia Felix Bank), a defunct Romanian bank
 Bedfordshire, a historic county in England, Chapman code
 Beiersdorf AG, a multinational corporation based in Hamburg, Germany
 Berlin Demography Forum, an annual international conference on demographic issues
 Board foot, unit of measure for volume of lumber
 Bois-des-Filion, Quebec, a town in Quebec, Canada
 Bund Deutscher Frauenvereine (1894-1933), a defunct German women's organization

Technology 
 Building Distribution Frame, a type of distribution frame in telecommunications
 PCI BDF (bus/device/function), a range of configurable addresses in PCI configuration space
 Glyph Bitmap Distribution Format, a file format for storing bitmap fonts

Military
 Bangladesh Forces, the combined forces of Bangladesh during its war of independence in 1971
 Bahrain Defense Force, the military of Bahrain
 Barbados Defence Force, the military of Barbados
 Belize Defence Force, the military of Belize
 Botswana Defence Force, the military of Botswana